The Hardee County Courthouse, built in 1927, is an historic courthouse building located at 417 West Main Street in Wauchula, Florida. It was designed by architect H.G. Little of Wauchula in the Classical Revival style of architecture. Robertson Construction Co. was the builder. In 1989, the Hardee County Courthouse was listed in A Guide to Florida's Historic Architecture, published by the University of Florida Press.

References

Buildings and structures in Hardee County, Florida
County courthouses in Florida
Government buildings completed in 1927
Neoclassical architecture in Florida
1927 establishments in Florida